Events from the year 1998 in Denmark.

Incumbents
 Monarch - Margrethe II
 Prime minister - Poul Nyrup Rasmussen

Events
 14 June - The Great Belt Fixed Link opens to traffic, connecting eastern and western Denmark.

Undated

Culture

Architecture

Film
 1 May – The first Dogme 95 film, Thomas Vinterberg's The Celebration, is released.
 20 May – Dogme #2—Lars von Trier's The Idiots—is released.
 May – The Celebration wins the Prix du Jury at the 51st Cannes Film Festival.

Literature

Music

Sports

Football
 21 May  Brøndby IF wins the 1997–98 Danish Cup by defeating F.C. Copenhagen 41 in the final.
 10 June – 12 July – Denmark participates in the 1998 FIFA World Cup in France.
 24 June – Denmark takes the second place in Group C of the initial group stage and is on to the knockout stage.
 28 June Denmark defeats Nigeria 4–1 in the Round of 16.
 3 July – Denmark is defeated 3–2 by Brazil in the quarterfinal.

Badminton
 Kastrup Magleby BK wins Europe Cup.

Cycling
 8 April – Lars Michaelsen finishes second in the Gent–Wevelgem road cycling race in Belgium.
 April – Bo Hamburger wins La Flèche Wallonne.
 29 August – Rolf Sørensen wins the 1998 Ronde van Nederland.
  Silvio Martinello (ITA) and Marco Villa (ITA) win the Six Days of Copenhagen sox-day track cycling race.

Handball
 20 December – Denmark wins silver at the 1998 European Women's Handball Championship in the Netherlands after being defeated by Norway in the final.

Other
 1 February – Thomas Bjørn wins Heineken Classic in Australia on the 1998 European Tour.
 18–25 April – With five gold medals, two silver medals and six bronze medals, Denmark finishes as the best nation at the 16th European Badminton Championships in Sofia, Bulgaria.
 3 September – Erik Gundersen wins the 1988 Individual Speedway World Championship.

Births
 23 January - Thomas Meilstrup, singer, actor and son of Dansk Melodi Grand Prix star Gry Meilstrup (Gry Johansen).
 31 March - Oskar Buur, soccer player
 29 October - Prince Konstantinos-Alexios of Greece and Denmark, eldest son and second child of Crown Prince Pavlos and Crown Princess Marie-Chantal of Greece

Deaths
 5 September - Verner Panton, designer (born 1926)

References

 
Denmark
Years of the 20th century in Denmark
1990s in Denmark